Blaesheim is a commune in the Bas-Rhin department in Grand Est in northeastern France.

Population

Blaesheim process
A meeting held in Blaesheim, January 2001, between Jacques Chirac and Gerhard Schröder has given this name to a regular series of informal meetings between the French President, the German Chancellor, and their foreign ministers. The meetings are held alternately in France and Germany.

See also
Communes of the Bas-Rhin department

References

Communes of Bas-Rhin